Minuscule 783 (in the Gregory-Aland numbering), ε462 (von Soden), is a Greek minuscule manuscript of the New Testament written on parchment. Palaeographically it has been assigned to the 14th century. The manuscript has complex contents.

Description 
The codex contains the text of the four Gospels, on 211 parchment leaves (size ). The text is written in one column (sometimes two) per page, 26-28 lines per page.

There is also another division according to the smaller Ammonian Sections (in Mark 241, last in 16:20), but without references to the Eusebian Canons.

It contains tables of the  before each Gospel, lectionary markings at the margin, incipits, liturgical books (Synaxarion and Menologion), and pictures (from the older manuscript).

Text 
The Greek text of the codex is a representative of the Byzantine text-type. Hermann von Soden classified it to the textual family Kx. Aland placed it in Category V.

According to the Claremont Profile Method it represent the textual family Kx in Luke 1 and Luke 20. In Luke 10 no profile was made.

History 
C. R. Gregory dated the manuscript to the 14th century. The manuscript is currently dated by the INTF to the 14th century.

Formerly it was housed in the monastery μεγαλων πυλων 17. The manuscript was noticed in catalogue from 1876.

It was added to the list of New Testament manuscripts by Gregory (783). Gregory saw the manuscript in 1886.

The manuscript is now housed at the National Library of Greece (71) in Athens.

See also 

 List of New Testament minuscules
 Biblical manuscript
 Textual criticism
 Minuscule 782

References

Further reading 

 

Greek New Testament minuscules
14th-century biblical manuscripts
Manuscripts of the National Library of Greece